Fanfan la Tulipe may refer to:

 Fanfan la Tulipe (poem), an 1819 pome by Paul Émile Debraux
 Fanfan la Tulipe (operetta), an 1882 operetta by Louis Varney

Film
 Fanfan la Tulipe (1907 film), a 1907 silent short film
 Fanfan la Tulipe (1925 film), a French swashbuckler film
 Fanfan la Tulipe (1952 film), a 1952 version featuring Gina Lollobrigida
 Fanfan la Tulipe (2003 film), a remake of the earlier films starring Penélope Cruz

See also
 Fanfan (disambiguation)
 Tulip (disambiguation)